Carl Gottlob Füssel   (1778 – 23 July 1860) was a Danish clarinetist and composer.

See also
List of Danish composers

References
This article was initially translated from the Danish Wikipedia.

Danish clarinetists
Danish composers
Male composers
1778 births
1860 deaths